Povl Hamburger   (22 June 1901 - 20 November 1972) was a Danish organist and composer.
Notable works include Musikens Historie I-II, 1936–37, Harmonilære, 1939, Modulationslære, 1941, Kirketoneart, 1948, and Harmonisk analyse, 1951.  He was once renowned for his ability to play the piano standing up.

See also
List of Danish composers

References
This article was initially translated from the Danish Wikipedia.

Male composers
1901 births
1972 deaths
Danish classical organists
Male classical organists
20th-century classical musicians
20th-century Danish composers
20th-century organists
20th-century Danish male musicians